SS Horace Binney was a Liberty ship built in the United States during World War II. She was named after Horace Binney, an American lawyer, author, and public speaker who served as an Anti-Jacksonian in the United States House of Representatives.

Construction
Horace Binney was laid down on 5 July 1942, under a Maritime Commission (MARCOM) contract, MCE hull 62, by the Bethlehem-Fairfield Shipyard, Baltimore, Maryland; sponsored by Miss Bertha Joseph, the secretary of Senator George L. P. Radcliffe of Maryland, and was launched on 25 August 1942.

History
She was allocated to American Export Lines, Inc., on 31 August 1942. On 1 April 1948, she was sold to the Belgium company Etablisements Dohmen et Habets SA., and scrapped in Antwerp.

References

Bibliography

 
 
 
 

 

Liberty ships
Ships built in Baltimore
1942 ships
Maritime incidents in May 1945